Bénoué is a department of North Province in Cameroon. The department covers an area of 13,614 km and as of 2005 had a total population of 1,781,955. The capital of the department lies at Garoua.

Subdivisions
The department is divided administratively into 11 communes and in turn into villages.

Communes 

 Barndaké (also known as Mayo Hourna Arrondissement)
 Bashéo (Baschéo)
 Bibemi
 Dembo
 Garoua (urban)
 Garoua (rural)
 Gashiga (also known as Demsa Arrondissement)
 Lagdo
 Ngong (also known as Tcheboa Arrondissement)
 Pitoa
 Touroua

Gallery

See also
Communes of Cameroon

References

Departments of Cameroon
North Region (Cameroon)